Krzysztof Kretkowski (born August 5, 1977 in Inowrocław) is a Polish footballer (striker) playing currently for Wisła Płock. He joined this club in the winter-break 2006/2007 season from Unia Janikowo. It was said he was one of the best strikers in Polish II Liga, when he played for Unia Janikowo.

Clubs 
 1998 - Goplania Inowrocław
 1999 - Elana Toruń
 1999 -2005 Goplania Inowrocław
 2005 - Zdrój Ciechocinek
 2006 - Unia Janikowo
 2007–present Wisła Płock

External links
 

1977 births
Living people
Polish footballers
Unia Janikowo players
Wisła Płock players
People from Inowrocław
Sportspeople from Kuyavian-Pomeranian Voivodeship
Association football forwards